Chryseobacterium montanum  is a Gram-negative, strictly aerobic, non-spore-forming and rod-shaped bacterium from the genus of Chryseobacterium which has been isolated from soil from the Tianmen Mountain in China.

References

External links
Type strain of Chryseobacterium montanum at BacDive -  the Bacterial Diversity Metadatabase

montanum
Bacteria described in 2016